

Films

References

1987 in LGBT history
1987